The Honeywell FX5 was a 6,000lb-thrust (27kN) geared turbofan based on a technology demonstrator core. Aiming for a 20%-plus reduction in cost of ownership from the TFE731-60 and to span a  family, it could have been certificated within 36 months. It was proposed for the Dassault Falcon 7X business jet launched in 2001, but the Pratt & Whitney Canada PW307 was finally selected. The Honeywell range comprises the previous  Lycoming ALF502/Honeywell LF507 and the subsequent  Honeywell HTF7000.

References

Honeywell
High-bypass turbofan engines
Geared turbofan engines